Helmut Köllen (2 March 1950 – 3 May 1977) was a German bass and guitar player as well as a singer for the band Triumvirat.

Career

Early years
Early in his musical career, Helmut Köllen gained experience in various local bands in Cologne, Germany. In the seventies, he became the bassist and vocalist for the progressive rock band Triumvirat, after replacing Hans-Georg Pape (who had just got married) the band's previous bass player, who left the group before the completion of one of their most successful albums, Illusions on a Double Dimple. After the release of that album in 1974, Triumvirat with Helmut Köllen then embarked on a tour around the United States supporting Fleetwood Mac. In 1975, Köllen got back to the studio along with his fellow musicians to record the concept album Spartacus, and soon after the album, a tour in the United States. During that year, Triumvirat also did a tour of Europe supporting Grand Funk Railroad. At the end of 1975, Köllen left Triumvirat to pursue a solo career, once his own musical inclinations began to drift away from that of the rest of the band.

In 1976, the German group Jail released their only album You Can Help Me, which featured Helmut Köllen as a guest musician on some of the songs (vocals and guitar), including the A-side of the band's single, "Julie". Köllen briefly returned to Triumvirat, but nothing really came out from that reunion.

Solo album
In late 1976, Köllen began recording what would be his only solo album You Won't See Me, named after one of The Beatles' songs that he liked the most. The album featured Helmut Köllen on vocals and guitar (bass, acoustic and electric), and also fellow Triumvirat musician and cousin Jürgen Fritz, who played keyboards, and helped to engineer and produce the album along with then famous German engineer and record producer Conny Plank at "Conny's Studio", Wolperath, West Germany. Other musicians included Dieter Petereit of Passport on bass guitar, Mathias Holtmann playing drums, and among various backing vocalists like Brigitte Witt and The Horn and String Section, Köllen's sister Elke Köllen. Helmut Köllen continued to record music until his death on 3 May 1977.

Television
In January 1975, Helmut Köllen appeared with Triumvirat on In Concert, a television show broadcast by ABC, playing music from the Illusions on a Double Dimple album. The host of the show, Don E. Branker, stated that the video from that performance no longer exists.

Other important interests
Köllen was also an experienced auto mechanic and race driver, and had plans to continue in this area in the future as well.

Death
On 3 May 1977, Köllen died from carbon monoxide poisoning at the age of 27 while listening to some of the studio tracks in his car's cassette player while running the engine in his garage. A little while after his death, German group Birth Control wrote and recorded a song as a tribute to Helmut Köllen entitled "We All Thought We Knew You", which was featured on their 1977 album Increase. His debut solo album You Won't See Me was issued posthumously by Harvest in Germany in October 1977. It is dedicated to Köllen's parents.

Discography

Notes

References

1950 births
1977 deaths
Progressive rock musicians
German rock bass guitarists
Male bass guitarists
German rock singers
Deaths from carbon monoxide poisoning
20th-century German male singers
20th-century bass guitarists
20th-century German male musicians
German male guitarists